Shahabuddin Medical College (Pronounced as Śāhābuddina mēḍikēla kalēja) is a medical college of Bangladesh. It is located at Gulshan of capital city Dhaka. Established in 2003, this institute is one of the private medical colleges of Bangladesh. It offers a program leading to an MBBS degree.  The college is affiliated to University of Dhaka.

History
Shahabuddin Medical College was established in 2003, and the college began admitting students. Academic classes started on 18 April which is celebrated as "SMC DAY". The 1st year, beginning class, or "Batch", was named SM-01.

Principals

Academics

Professional Examination Centre Code: 20

Course
 MBBS (Dhaka University)
 Departments
 Pre clinical departments
 Anatomy
 Physiology
 Biochemistry
 Community Medicine
 Pharmacology
 Pathology
 Microbiology
 Forensic Medicine
 Clinical departments
 Medicine
 Surgery
 Gynae
 Obs

Batches

Batches of SMC 
Each entering Class of the college, which is known as a "Batch", is designated by the prefix 'SM' followed by the batch number. SM is a short form of "Shahabuddin Medical"

References

External links

2003 establishments in Bangladesh
Educational institutions established in 2003
Hospitals in Dhaka
Medical colleges in Bangladesh
Universities and colleges in Dhaka